David O. Huot (born April 4, 1942) is a New Hampshire politician who formerly served in the New Hampshire House of Representatives.

His father, J. Oliva Huot was a United States congressman. He graduated from the Georgetown law school in 1967, and later worked as a lawyer in Laconia until in 1979, when he was nominated a judge for the Laconia district court by the Governor.

References

Living people
Democratic Party members of the New Hampshire House of Representatives
21st-century American politicians
1942 births